The W-85 heavy machine gun or QJC-88 vehicle mounted heavy machine gun is a gas-operated heavy machine gun designed in the People's Republic of China. It fires the Soviet-designed 12.7×108mm round. The W-85 was never accepted into the PLA service in its original configuration, only adopted as vehicle mounted machine gun as the QJC-88. 

Another similar named Type 85 heavy machine gun, was adopted as the standard infantry heavy machine gun in the PLA.

Overview

The W85 was designed to be as light as possible for infantry use. Its small receiver is of generally rectangular cross-section, and it has a thick gas tube below the barrel containing a conventional gas piston. In addition to iron sights, it has rails for optics or anti-aircraft sights. It fires 12.7×108mm rounds from belts and is more accurate than the Type 54 heavy machine gun, but the thinner barrel overheats faster. 

In trials, the W85 lost out to the Type 85 as an infantry weapon and was not accepted into PLA service.

QJC-88
Although the W-85 in its tripod, original configuration was not accepted into Chinese service, years later a variant was adopted called the QJC-88. The QJC-88 was introduced as a pintle mounted machine gun for tanks and armored vehicles. It weighs the same, is solenoid fired, and is mounted on a special cradle allowing for elevation angles of -5 to +65°.

Mounted platforms: 
Type 99 tank: as commander heavy machine gun.
Type 96 tank: as commander heavy machine gun.
Type 15 tank: as commander heavy machine gun on a remote weapon station.
Type 59 Durjoy tank: as commander heavy machine gun.
Type 05: on armored personal carrier variant. 
Type 08: on various comigrations, such as ZSL-10 APC, ZTL-11 assault vehicle, and Type 08 Artillery Reconnaissance Vehicle.
PLL-05: as commander heavy machine gun.
Type 89 AFV: on various comigrations as the self-defense weapon.

Users

 : Produced locally under license
 
 

 
 
 :
 
 : Libyan National Army
 
 : Used by Rwandan peacekeepers in Darfur.
 : South Sudan Democratic Movement
 
 : Manufactured locally as Khawad.
 
 : Possibly intercepted Iranian delivery to the Houthis transferred to Ukraine

Non-State Actors
  Free Syrian Army
 
 People's Defense Units
  Tamil Tigers

See also
 Type 77/85
 DShK
 NSV
 QJZ-89
 QJG-02
 QJZ-171
 M2 Browning

References

Bibliography
 

Cold War weapons of China
Machine guns of the People's Republic of China
Heavy machine guns
12.7×108 mm machine guns